van Lint is a surname. Notable people with the surname include:

Hendrik Frans van Lint (1684–1763), Flemish landscape painter
Jacinta van Lint (born 1978), Australian swimmer
Jack van Lint (1932–2004), Dutch academic and mathematician
Louis Van Lint (1909–1986), Belgian painter
Pieter van Lint (1609–1690), Flemish history painter

Surnames of Dutch origin